The Icelandic Basketball Association (Icelandic:Körfuknattleikssamband Íslands - KKÍ) is the national governing body of basketball in Iceland and is a member of the continental association FIBA Europe and the global International Basketball Federation (FIBA). It directs and oversees all of the national basketball teams of Iceland, including both the junior and senior national teams of both men and women.

It was founded on January 29, 1961 and its first chairman was Bogi Þorsteinsson, but current chairman is Hannes S. Jónsson.

Competitions 

Men's
Domino's deild karla
Division I
Division II
Division III

Women's
Domino's deild kvenna
Division I
Division II

National teams

Iceland men
Iceland men's national basketball team
Iceland men's national under-20 basketball team
Iceland men's national under-19 basketball team
Iceland men's national under-17 basketball team

Iceland Women
Iceland women's national basketball team
Iceland women's national under-20 basketball team
Iceland women's national under-19 basketball team
Iceland women's national under-17 basketball team

Awards
Icelandic Basketball Player of the Year

Chairmen

 Bogi Þorsteinsson 1961–1969
 Hólmsteinn Sigurðsson  1969–1973
 Einar Bollason  1973–1976
 Páll Júlíusson  1976–1977
 Sigurður Ingólfsson  1978–1979
 Stefán Ingólfsson  1979–1980
 Kristbjörn Albertsson  1980
 Stefán Ingólfsson  1980–1981
 Kristbjörn Albertsson  1981–1982
 Helgi Ágústsson  1982–1983
 Þórdís Anna Kristjánsdóttir  1983–1984
 Eiríkur Ingólfsson  1984–1985
 Björn Björgvinsson  1985–1988
 Kolbeinn Pálsson  1988–1996
 Ólafur Rafnsson  1996–2006
 Hannes S. Jónsson  2006–present

References

External links
Official website 
Iceland at FIBA site

Basketball
Basketball governing bodies in Europe
Basketball in Iceland
1961 establishments in Iceland
Icelandic